Fuad Kasumović (born 20 March 1958) is a Bosnian politician, economist and businessman serving as mayor of Zenica since November 2016.

Biography
Kasumović was born on 20 March 1958 in Gornji Vakuf. After graduating from Economics Faculty Sarajevo (1987), he has been employed at Coal Mine "Gračanica" in his hometown, and soon became CFO of this company. He worked at the mine until Bosnian War began in 1992. During the war, he was a member of Army of the Republic of Bosnia and Herzegovina and was awarded its highest recognition, the Golden Lily, and upon his graduation he obtained a job in the Ministry of Dedicated Production in the Government of Republic of Bosnia and Herzegovina. From 1990 to 2016, Kasumović was a member (1990–2016) and functionary of the Party of Democratic Action (SDA). Subsequently, he participated in founding the Independent Bloc in September 2017 – whose president is Senad Šepić (who is a particular critic of Bakir Izetbegović's politics) – and used to be its member until April 2019.

Kasumović began his political career in 1996 as Minister of Finance in the Central Bosnia Canton (SBK). Prior to end of his term in the office, in July 1998, he was appointed Deputy Director of Customs Administration of Federation of Bosnia and Herzegovina (FBiH). Following his removal from office in 2001, he remained in the Customs Administration for two more years as a financial advisor. Following establishment (by OHR, Kasumović and others) of Indirect Taxation Authority in 2004, Kasumović was appointed Advisor to Director for International Cooperation. He remained in this post throughout judicial process until his termination in 2007. In the same year he was appointed Deputy Minister of Finance of BiH.

During a period of 2010, he was president of Čelik Kasumović. Kasumović ran in 2010 general election but did not win enough votes to enter House of Representatives of Parliamentary Assembly. However, that year he received trust for second term of Deputy Minister of Finance and Treasury. He was removed from office in October 2012 due to the SDA's departure from ruling state-level coalition. In 2015 and 2016, Kasumović was a member of the Federal Supervisory Board of Development. At the 2016 municipal elections, he was elected mayor of Zenica as an independent candidate; his re-election by a three-to-one margin win followed at the 2020 municipal elections, held on 15 November.

Accusations
Cantonal Prosecutor's Office of Sarajevo Canton charged Kasumović with malpractice because he, as a director of the FBiH Customs Administration, signed a transfer order for 69,000 KM to Tuzla customs office for material costs and lease of premises. However, the money was used to buy flat of an officer of the Administration. After a five-year trial, Kasumović was acquitted. In 2008, Central Election Commission submitted a report against Kasumović to the BiH Prosecutor's Office on suspicion that he did not report all assets in 2007 property file. Kasumović told CIN reporters that no one had contacted him about the issue. Kasumović also said that he had not been contacted in connection with the allegations made against him by the FBiH Financial Police. In 2003, this police institution submitted a report to the SBK Prosecutor's Office, in which Kasumović was suspected of having paid himself and other officials of the FBiH Customs Administration financial compensation for a non-existent separate life.

On 1 December 2021, Kasumović was taken into SIPA-custody; month-planned detention in Zenica prison was discontinued after nine days.

Personal life
Kasumović and his wife Mersija, who is also a politician, have one child. The family owns three business offices, including a petrol station in Zenica of which price Kasumović holds over a half a million KM value.

On 26 October 2020, it was confirmed that he tested positive for COVID-19, amid its pandemic in Bosnia and Herzegovina. On 31 March 2021, Kasumović received a dose of the Pfizer anti-COVID vaccine.

See also
Golden Lily

Notes

References

Further reading
Interview from candidacy for City Mayor 2016, L. Sarajlić ("Naša riječ" via fuadkasumovic.ba)
Program from candidacy for City Mayor 2016, F. Kasumović (self)

External links

Official biography
CIN profile 

1958 births
Living people
People from Gornji Vakuf
Bosniaks of Bosnia and Herzegovina
Bosnia and Herzegovina Muslims
Bosniak politicians
Bosnia and Herzegovina politicians
Bosnia and Herzegovina economists
Bosnia and Herzegovina businesspeople
Politicians of the Federation of Bosnia and Herzegovina
Party of Democratic Action politicians
Mayors of Zenica